Lisky is a locality, a settlement in the Dniprovskyi District, Kyiv, bordering Stara Darnytsia in the west. It stretches along Almatynska, Profspilkova, Kalachivska and Vilnyuska streets.

Dniprovskyi District, Kyiv